Alberto Longarella (13 May 1923 – 15 March 2017) was an Argentine wrestler. He competed at the 1948 Summer Olympics and the 1952 Summer Olympics.

References

External links
 

1923 births
2017 deaths
Argentine male sport wrestlers
Olympic wrestlers of Argentina
Wrestlers at the 1948 Summer Olympics
Wrestlers at the 1952 Summer Olympics
Place of birth missing
Wrestlers at the 1951 Pan American Games
Pan American Games silver medalists for Argentina
Pan American Games medalists in wrestling
Medalists at the 1951 Pan American Games
20th-century Argentine people
21st-century Argentine people